Bianca Sánchez (born on August 6, 1996) is a Uruguayan model and beauty pageant titleholder who was crowned Miss Uruguay 2015 and represented her country at the Miss Universe 2015 pageant.

Personal life
Bianca lives in Montevideo and works as a model.

Miss Uruguay 2015
On April 26, 2015 Bianca was crowned Miss Uruguay 2015 at Hotel Sofitel Montevideo. Fifteen contestants from across Uruguay competed for the crown. Sánchez was crowned by Miss Uruguay 2014, Johana Riva, while the 1st runner-up, or Miss World Uruguay 2015, Sherika De Armas was crowned by Romina Fernández, First Runner-up 2014. The pageant was broadcast live on VTV Uruguay.

Miss Universe 2015
As Miss Uruguay 2015, Bianca competed at the Miss Universe 2015 pageant but Unplaced.

References

External links
Official website

1996 births
Living people
Miss Universe 2015 contestants
Uruguayan beauty pageant winners